Nowbandian-e Pain (also Romanized as Nowbandīān-e Pā’īn; also known as Nowbandīān-e Kāfeh) is a village in Negur Rural District, Dashtiari District, Chabahar County, Sistan and Baluchestan Province, Iran. At the 2006 census, its population was 1,044, in 204 families.

References 

Populated places in Chabahar County